Folk Songs is an album by bassist Charlie Haden, saxophonist Jan Garbarek and guitarist Egberto Gismonti recorded in 1979 and released on the ECM label in 1981. The album follows the trio's first recording Magico (1980).

Reception 
The AllMusic review by Scott Yanow awarded the album four stars, stating, "One of the better ECM recordings... filled with moody originals, improvisations that blend together jazz and world music, and atmospheric ensembles. This date works well both as superior background music and for close listening".

Track listing 

 "Folk Song" (Traditional) – 8:12
 "Bôdas de Prata" (Egberto Gismonti, Geraldo Carneiro) – 4:44
 "Cego Aderaldo" (Gismonti) – 7:54
 "Veien" (Jan Garbarek) – 7:50
 "Equilibrista" (Gismonti) – 8:36
 "For Turiya" (Charlie Haden) – 7:42
 Recorded at Talent Studio in Oslo, Norway in November 1979

Personnel 
 Charlie Haden – bass
 Jan Garbarek – soprano saxophone, tenor saxophone
 Egberto Gismonti – guitar, piano

References

External links 
 Charlie Haden / Jan Garbarek / Egberto Gismonti - Folk Songs (1981) album review by Scott Yanow, credits & releases at AllMusic
 Charlie Haden / Jan Garbarek / Egberto Gismonti - Folk Songs (1981) album releases & credits at Discogs
 Charlie Haden / Jan Garbarek / Egberto Gismonti - Folk Songs (1981) album to be listened as stream on Spotify

ECM Records albums
Charlie Haden albums
Jan Garbarek albums
Egberto Gismonti albums
1981 albums
Albums produced by Manfred Eicher